Doctor Sacrobosco (German:Dr. Sacrobosco, der große Unheimliche) is a 1923 German silent film directed by Josef Firmans and starring Adolf Böckl, Margit Piller and Käte Robert-Wenk.

Cast
 Adolf Böckl 
 Margit Piller 
 Käte Robert-Wenk 
 Wilhelm Diegelmann 
 Victor Colani 
 Georg H. Schnell 
 Hans Ludolf 
 Fritz Greiner 
 Annie Gräsenau

References

Bibliography
 Giesen, Rolf. The Nosferatu Story: The Seminal Horror Film, Its Predecessors and Its Enduring Legacy. McFarland, 2019.
 James Marriott & Kim Newman. Horror: The Definitive Guide to the Cinema of Fear. André Deutsch, 2008.

External links

1923 films
Films of the Weimar Republic
German silent feature films
German black-and-white films